Hahncappsia volcanensis is a moth in the family Crambidae described by Hahn William Capps in 1967. It is found in Guatemala, Costa Rica and Venezuela.

The wingspan is 12–22 mm for males and 19–21 mm for females. Adults have been recorded on wing from January to October.

References

Moths described in 1967
Pyraustinae